Luka Bonačić (born 21 March 1955) is a Croatian football coach and former professional player.

Early life
He was born in Split, Croatia that was then part of Socialist Federal Republic of Yugoslavia. He began his football career at the Split Football Academy. He joined Hajduk Split in 1969 when he was 14.

Playing career
He signed a pro contract with Hajduk in 1971. He made 45 games for club and scored eight goals. He joined Grasshopper Club Zürich in 1979, but after one year he transferred to VfL Bochum. CD Málaga and Footscray JUST were Bonačić's next clubs. He retired after playing for Melbourne Croatia in 1986. He was called up for the Croatian national team in 1982 but never played.

Coaching career
Bonačić is known as coach who gives young talented players a chance. In the 1992–93 season, when he was NK Pazinka coach, he launched the career of Dado Prso, the former Rangers and Monaco striker. Also whilst at Slaven Belupo, he started the career of young central defender Ivica Križanac who currently plays for FC Zenit in Russia.

He was selected as Croatian Coach of the Year in 1996 when he reached the final of the Croatian Cup with middle-class Croatian club NK Varteks. In 1996, he won with Varteks against Dinamo Zagreb 4–3. 

Thanks to his success with NK Varteks, in the 1997–98 season he became head coach of top Croatian club Hajduk Split. Soon after Bonačić's appointment, however, the management board named coach Tomislav Ivić as Bonačić's assistant. Ivić preferred  defensive football and young coach Bonačić preferred attacking football. As a result, the team had a conflict of tactics.

After ten match days, Hajduk had won nine and lost only one match which made them leading the Croatian Championship with eight points advantage ahead of second ranking Dinamo Zagreb. The management board of Hajduk Split (controlled by Franjo Tuđman's assistants) decided to fire Bonačić and promoted Ivić to head coach. After two months, Hajduk had lost many points under Ivić and the management sacked him and asked Bonačić to return. Bonačić returned, but due to the points lost under Ivić, he could only manage a respectable second behind Dinamo Zagreb.

Bonačić is known as coach who doesn't like officials of clubs to decide which player will be in the starting eleven. On a few occasions he has left Croatian and foreign clubs when some presidents of clubs have tried to impose him which players "must" play in the first team. In 2006, he was attacked by a group of people whilst returning to his flat in Split. Bonačić claimed that agents of players which were only substitute during his stay at Hajduk because he thought that their quality was not enough good were behind the attack. A few months after this incident he has decided to leave Hajduk and he has told for Croatian press that he will never more return to Hajduk.

In 2006, Bonačić accepted an offer as head-coach of Iranian side Sepahan. He was highly successful with Sepahan winning the Hazfi Cup in 2006 and 2007. Also in 2007, he managed to take Sepahan to the AFC Champions League final but lost to Japanese side Urawa Red Diamonds 3–1 on aggregate. Sepahan became the first Iranian football club to make it to the knockout stage and final since Esteghlal in 1990's.

In January 2008, Bonačić signed an 18-month contract with Al-Nasr in Dubai and was sacked in February 2009.

In December 2010, Bonačić signed a contract with Azadegan League club Gostaresh based in Iran, Tabriz.

He returned to his previous club and was named as new head coach of Sepahan on 22 June 2011. After a 3–0 defeat to Mes Kerman in the Pro League and elimination from Champions League, Bonačić was dismissed by club chairman.

In September 2012, Bonačić took over the helm of NK Zagreb and headed this team until October 2012 when he was replaced by Miroslav Blažević.

On 27 December 2012, Bonačić joined Mes Kerman as head coach for the second time but left the team at the end of the season after leading the club at the sixth place. On 1 July 2013, he was named as the head coach of Zob Ahan, signed a one-year contract with the club. On 16 December 2013, it was announced that Luka will leave Zob Ahan in January 2014 and will be succeeded by Mojtaba Taghavi. On 23 January 2014, Luka returns as manager of Mes Kerman with signing a contract until the end of the season. He led Mes Kerman to the Hazfi Cup final for the first time, however, his side lost the match 1–0 to Tractor Sazi. On 6 April, Mes Kerman relegated to the Azadegan League after a 0–0 draw with Saba Qom. He was given a one-year contract by the club to lead them in Azadegan League and promotion back Mes Kerman to the Iran Pro League at the end of the season. However, he was sacked on 11 November 2014 after poor results. On 21 November 2014, he was named as manager of Qatar Stars League side Al-Shahania.

On 9 October 2019, Bonačić was named the new head coach of Varaždin in the Croatian First Football League.

In June 2020, Bonačić was re-appointed head coach of Iranian club Zob Ahan following the departure of Montenegrin coach Miodrag Radulović.

Statistics

Honours
NK Varteks
 Croatian Football Cup: Runner up 1995–96

Hajduk Split
Croatian First League: Runner up 1996–97, 1997–98

Sepahan
 Hazfi Cup: 2005–06, 2006–07
 AFC Champions League: Runner up 2007

Mes Kerman
 Hazfi Cup: Runner up 2013–14

References

External links

 
 

1955 births
Living people
Footballers from Split, Croatia
Association football midfielders
Yugoslav footballers
HNK Hajduk Split players
HNK Šibenik players
Grasshopper Club Zürich players
NK Maribor players
VfL Bochum players
CD Málaga footballers
Footscray JUST players
Melbourne Knights FC players
Yugoslav First League players
Swiss Super League players
Bundesliga players
Segunda División players
National Soccer League (Australia) players
Yugoslav expatriate footballers
Expatriate footballers in Switzerland
Yugoslav expatriate sportspeople in Switzerland
Expatriate footballers in West Germany
Yugoslav expatriate sportspeople in West Germany
Expatriate footballers in Spain
Yugoslav expatriate sportspeople in Spain
Expatriate soccer players in Australia
Yugoslav expatriate sportspeople in Australia
Yugoslav football managers
Croatian football managers
NK Zadar managers
NK Varaždin managers
HNK Rijeka managers
NK Osijek managers
HNK Hajduk Split managers
NK Slaven Belupo managers
NK GOŠK Dubrovnik managers
ND Mura 05 managers
NK Hrvatski Dragovoljac managers
HNK Šibenik managers
Foolad F.C. managers
Esteghlal Ahvaz F.C. managers
FK Dinamo Tirana managers
Sepahan S.C. managers
Al-Nasr SC (Dubai) managers
Sanat Mes Kerman F.C. managers
NK Zagreb managers
Zob Ahan Esfahan F.C. managers
Al-Shahania Sports Club managers
Al Ahli SC (Doha) managers
Al-Arabi SC (Qatar) managers
Croatian Football League managers
Kategoria Superiore managers
Yugoslav expatriate football managers
Expatriate association football managers in New Zealand
Yugoslav expatriate sportspeople in New Zealand
Croatian expatriate football managers
Expatriate football managers in Slovenia
Croatian expatriate sportspeople in Slovenia
Expatriate football managers in Iran
Croatian expatriate sportspeople in Iran
Expatriate football managers in Albania
Croatian expatriate sportspeople in Albania
Expatriate football managers in the United Arab Emirates
Croatian expatriate sportspeople in the United Arab Emirates
Expatriate football managers in Qatar
Croatian expatriate sportspeople in Qatar
Persian Gulf Pro League managers